Yascha Benjamin Mounk (born 10 June 1982) is a German-born American political scientist. , he is currently Associate Professor of the Practice of International Affairs at Johns Hopkins University's School of Advanced International Studies in Washington, D. C.

Early life
Mounk was born and raised in Munich. His mother was Jewish and a socialist, and was forced to leave Poland in 1969 due to anti-Semitism. He wrote that much of his mother's side of the family was killed in the Holocaust. He has said he felt like a stranger in Germany, and though German is his native language, he never felt accepted as a "true German" by his peers. Mounk received a BA degree in history from the University of Cambridge, where he was a member of Trinity College. He then received a PhD from Harvard University in the United States, with the dissertation The Age of Responsibility: On the Role of Choice, Luck, and Personal Responsibility in Contemporary Politics and Philosophy. He remained in the US as a lecturer on government, and was named a senior fellow in the Political Reform Program at the think tank New America. Mounk became an American citizen in 2017.

Career
He was executive director of the Renewing the Centre team at the Tony Blair Institute for Global Change. As a freelance journalist, he has written for The New York Times, The Wall Street Journal, Foreign Affairs, The Atlantic, and Slate. He runs a podcast called The Good Fight. His dissertation on the role of personal responsibility in contemporary politics and philosophy has been published by Harvard University Press.

In July 2020, he founded Persuasion, an online magazine devoted to defending the values of free societies.

Political views
Mounk joined the Social Democratic Party of Germany (SPD) as a teenager. In 2015, he resigned from the party, doing so by publishing an open letter to then-chairman Sigmar Gabriel. He cited the lack of helpfulness of German institutions to refugees, the passive attitude of SPD leaders and other parts of the party during the Crimea crisis in 2014, and the SPD's policy on Greece, which he called a "betrayal of the social democratic dream of a united Europe".

In a February 2018 interview published in Süddeutsche Zeitung, Mounk stated that he had changed his position on nationalism. He initially considered it a relic of the past that must be overcome, but he now advocates an "inclusive nationalism" to head off the threat of aggressive nationalism. On the German television newscast Tagesthemen, he stated that Germany is on a "historically unique experiment, namely to transform a mono-ethnic and mono-cultural democracy into a multi-ethnic one". In the Israeli newspaper Haaretz, Mounk advised the "liberal camp" to adopt this inclusive nationalism, to foster a multi-ethnic and democratic society: "The key ... is the adoption of the populist demand that people and nations should again feel they have control of their lives or their destiny."

Bibliography

Books
 
 The People vs. Democracy: Why Our Freedom Is in Danger and How to Save It. Harvard University Press, 2018, 
 The Age of Responsibility – Luck, Choice and the Welfare State
 The Great Experiment: Why Diverse Democracies Fall Apart and How They Can Endure, Penguin Press (2022)

Articles
"The Great American Eye Exam Scam", The Atlantic (November 2019)
 "How I Became An American", The New York Times (March 2017)
 "Yes, American Democracy Could Break Down", Politico (October 2016)
 "How Political Science Gets Politics Wrong", The Chronicle of Higher Education (October 2016)
 "Echt Deutsch", Harper's (April 2017)
 "The Week Democracy Died", Slate  (August 2016)
 "What We Do Now", Slate (November 2016)
 "German, Jewish, and Neither", The New York Times (January 2014)
 "Pitchfork Politics", Foreign Affairs (August 2014)
 "Responsibility Redefined", Democracy: A Journal of Ideas (January 2017)
 "Signs of Deconsolidation", Journal of Democracy (January 2017)
 "The Danger of Deconsolidation. The Democratic disconnect", Journal of Democracy (July 2016)
 
 "The Undemocratic Dilemma", Journal of Democracy (April 2018)
 "What the New Sokal Hoax Reveals About Academia", The Atlantic, What the New Sokal Hoax Reveals About Academia - The Atlantic (Oct 2018)

Interviews and profiles
 Sueddeutsche.de, 15 February 2018, von Sebastian Gierke: "Die liberale Demokratie zerfällt gerade"
 Deutschlandfunkkultur.de, 17 February 2018: Der Prophet des Untergangs der Demokratie (0:29:54)
 Deutschlandfunk.de, 25 March 2018: Demokratie in Gefahr? (0:29:06)
 "How Stable Are Democracies?", The New York Times (November 2016)
 "Containing Trump", The Atlantic (March 2017)
 "Can Yascha Mounk Save Liberal Democracy?", The Chronicle of Higher Education (April 2017)

References

External links
 
 Johns Hopkins University profile
 
 Slate: article collection
 Biography and articles in Zeit Online

1982 births
Living people
20th-century German Jews
Alumni of Trinity College, Cambridge
American political philosophers
Civic nationalism
German emigrants to the United States
German philosophers
German political philosophers
Harvard University alumni
People with acquired American citizenship
Populism scholars
The Atlantic (magazine) people